Zahid Yibram Muñoz López  (born 29 January 2001) is a Mexican professional footballer who plays as a midfielder for Liga MX club Guadalajara.

Club career

Atlético Zacatepec (loan)
Muñoz professional debut was on January 23, 2019, in the Copa MX with Zacatepec playing against Querétaro ending in a 4–0 loss.

Guadalajara
Muñoz debuted in the Liga MX with Guadalajara first-team against Santos Laguna on August 2, 2020, subbing in during the 73rd minute which ended in a 2–0 loss.

Career statistics

Club

References

External links
 
 
 
 

2001 births
Living people
Mexico under-20 international footballers
Association football midfielders
Ascenso MX players
Atlético San Luis footballers
Atlético Zacatepec footballers
C.D. Guadalajara footballers
Footballers from Jalisco
Liga de Expansión MX players
Liga MX players
Mexican footballers